Carlos do Carmo is an album by fado singer Carlos do Carmo. It was released in 1970 on the Tecla label. It was later re-released by Universal Music Portugal.

Track listing
Side A
 "Gaivota"	(A. O'Neill, A. Oulman) [4:04]
 "Bairro Alto" (C. Neves, F. Carvalhinho) [2:22]
 "Vim para 0 Fado" (Julio de Sousa) [2:10]	
 "Fado da Noite" (L. Neves, O. Silva) [2:50]	
 "Será Triste Mas É Fado" (Frederico de Brito) [3:12]	
 "Já Me Deixou" (A. Ribeiro, Max) [3:20]

Side B
 "A Saudade Aconteceu" (Jorge Rosa, Popular) [2:03]
 "Não Se Morre De Saudade" (Julio de Sousa, Popular) [2:57]
 "Mãos Vazias" (J. Braganca, A Duarte) [2:20]
 "Guardei Na Minha Saudade" (V.L. Couto, J. Proença) [2:39]
 "A Voz Que Eu Tenho" (V. Limha Courto, J. Proença) [2:39]	
 "Rodam As Quatro Estações" (F. Texeira, R. Pinto) [2:44]]

Musical credits
 Jorge Costa Pinho - arrangements and direction of orchestra
 Fontes Rocha - guitar
 Carvalhinho - guitar
 A. Chainho - guitar
 José Maria Nóbrega - viola
 R Silva - viola

References

Carlos do Carmo albums
1970 albums
Portuguese-language albums